Vosges Matin is a French regional daily newspaper focusing particularly on news from the Vosges department and its neighboring departments of Meurthe-et-Moselle, Meuse, Haute-Saône, Doubs and Territoire de Belfort. Its headquarters are in Épinal.

History 
Launched on January 2, 2009, Vosges-Matin is a regional daily created at the initiative of L'Est Républicain (which bought the title in 1999) to replace La Liberté de l'Est.

On November 16, 2016, a new tabloid format was introduced. The 64-page journal is divided into two notebooks: a general and a local. On Mondays, the interior notebook is devoted to sport.

Local editions 

 Edition de la Plaine
 Edition du Soir Vosges
 Edition d'Epinal - Remiremont
 Edition de Saint-Dié - Massif des Vosges

References 

2009 establishments in France
Publications established in 2009
Daily newspapers published in France